John Tennant (born 25 December 1986) is a British politician, who was a Brexit Party Member of the European Parliament (MEP) for the North East of England between 2019 and the United Kingdom's withdrawal from the EU. and the former party leader of Independent Union, of which he is a councillor on Hartlepool Borough Council for the Jesmond ward.

In September 2019, all IU councillors, as well as the one Veterans and People's Party councillor, who made up the coalition at Hartlepool Borough Council defected to the Brexit Party, renaming their already existing coalition with the three Conservative councillors to the "Brexit and Conservative Coalition". Despite this, the IU was still registered with the Electoral Commission with Tennant listed as its current leader. Tennant stepped down from the IU leadership in February 2020 and was replaced by Shane Moore.

2019 European Parliament election
In May 2019, it was announced John Tennant was standing as a Brexit Party candidate in the 2019 European Parliament election for North East England. Upon the announcement, Tennant was criticised for comments he made on social media, praising the UKIP MEP Godfrey Bloom on the day he was ejected from the European parliament for addressing German colleague, Martin Schulz, the then leader of the German Social Democratic Party, with a Nazi slogan in 2010, and then another involving a joke he made regarding sex acts with a young woman in 2011. A spokesperson for the Brexit Party described his comments, which included discussing sex toys in "vulgar and obscene terms" and suggesting Liverpool FC fans are criminals, as "weak jokes".

Tennant, the former UKIP group leader for Hartlepool Borough Council, is said to have a close relationship with Nigel Farage whilst he was a UKIP councillor, organising his public events in the North East, according to a former UKIP advisor. According to Hartleborough Borough Council's Register of Members' Disclosable Pecuniary Interests, in May 2018 Tennant declared his profession as "office manager" to former UKIP and current Brexit Party MEP, Jonathan Arnott.

References

1986 births
Living people
Independent Union (political party)
Brexit Party MEPs
MEPs for England 2019–2020
Councillors in Hartlepool